The Mifflin Formation is a fossil bearing geologic formation in Illinois dating to the Ordovician period.

See also

 List of fossiliferous stratigraphic units in Illinois

References
 

Ordovician Iowa
Ordovician Illinois
Ordovician geology of Wisconsin
Ordovician southern paleotropical deposits